Focus on the Family Singapore is a Christian socially conservative, anti-abortion organisation based in Singapore. According to its website, FOTF seeks to strengthen the role of male and female in a marriage and traditional family unit. The organisation has conducted talks, workshops, nationwide events and counselled parents and couples, with the aim of advocating traditional family units.

FOTF Singapore is an affiliate of the American Christian conservative organisation, Focus on the Family, founded in 1977 by James Dobson. Focus on the Family Singapore was established in August 2000 and became a registered charity in 2002. It operates autonomously as a charity and is a donor-supported Institution of Public Character in Singapore.

Events and programmes

Family bonding and inmate rehabilitation
The charity organises parent-child bonding programmes with prison inmates, including its Dates with Dads (since 2012) and Family Care (since 2016) sessions.

Abstinence 

Focus organises a programmes, No Apologies, that promotes abstinence and the practice of safe sex to youths.

In 2009, following the new UNESCO guidelines for sexual education, there was much debate over the issue of teaching contraception methods to the young among civil groups such as AWARE and FOTF. Following the media attention, the Ministry of Education suspended all sexuality education programmes in schools, except those conducted by the school teachers. The ministry then conducted a vetting process. In 2010, FOTF was one of the six shortlisted external vendors that was chosen to conduct sexuality education workshops in Singapore schools.

Relationship and marriage programmes 
Focus organises marriage preparation programmes that aims to help couples address issues that they may face as newlyweds. It also created Celebrate Marriage, a marriage campaign to encourage married couples to invest in strengthening their relationship. In conjunction with Valentine’s Day in 2018, Focus launched a free online resource to give married couples practical tips, conversation starters, and date night ideas to nurture intimacy with their spouse.

On 7 October 2014, a Hwa Chong Institution (HCI) student who attended a relationship workshop, It’s UNcomplicated (IUC), conducted by Focus, shared an open letter she wrote to her principal on her Facebook page. She suggested that the programme stereotyped males and females, portraying girls as "emotional", "want(ing) security" and wanting to "look attractive", while boys "need respect" and "don't want a girlfriend that questions their opinions and argues with their decisions all the time". The programme material also featured lines such as "a guy can’t not want to look" and suggested that girls indulge in doublespeak while boys mean exactly what they say. Focus on the Family Singapore was appointed by the Ministry of Social and Family Development to conduct such modules for junior college students.

Focus has since issued an official response, claiming that the content of the workshop was based on material by experts, including Gary Chapman (author of The Five Love Languages) and Jeff and Shaunti Feldhahn (author of For Women Only: What You Need to Know About the Inner Lives of Men) Focus also defended its programmes by pointing out more than 85 per cent of the students polled had rated it as "Very Good/Good" while 89 per cent of students saw he presentation of its facilitators as "Very Good/Good". It was not specified in the press release how many students had actually been surveyed. Shaunti Feldhahn wrote an open letter in response to the issue, saying that the student had misunderstood the material, "We strongly disagree with the idea that teaching the brain wiring and mutual respect is somehow contributing to a "rape culture."

On 17 October 2014, in response to this issue, a letter co-signed by 13 research scientists from National University of Singapore and Yale-NUS contended that the evidence of stark sex-based differences - in both gross brain function and the majority of our cognitive functions - are inconclusive.

The Ministry of Education confirmed in July 2014 that relationship and sexuality programs conducted by Focus on the Family Singapore would cease by end-2014 as planned.

Counselling services

The organisation has been called out for advocating conversion therapies for gays. It currently offers counselling on gender identity issues and unwanted same-sex attraction.

Speaking out against artists 
Focus also received criticism as it was deemed to speak out against artistes and events that undermines traditional family values. In 2015, they expressed support for an online campaign that cited concerns to have American star Adam Lambert as part of the line-up of performances during the national countdown due to his track record of provocative stage performances.

While there has not been any issues when Lambert performed in Singapore at private events in the past, organisers of the petition pointed out that the countdown show was a national event that included family audience, including young children. Counter petitions were set up stating that the petition to remove Adam Lambert possesses “obvious sexual orientation discrimination”.

A newspaper forum letter writer pointed out that the “issue is not about a performer's sexuality; the issue is about sexually provocative acts, especially "in the moment" acts, on a live show aired on national television."

Relationship with Focus on the Family United States
Focus on the Family Singapore is operated and directed independently of Focus on the Family US, although the two organisations are closely affiliated. In 2009, Focus on the Family Singapore received S$45,477 in grants from the larger American organisation. In contrast, it received over S$1 million from donations and fees recovered through its impact programs and services.

Management
Past and present presidents of the organisation include:
 Tan Thuan Seng (2002–2007)
 Joanna Koh-Hoe (2007–2012)
 Lim Yu-Ming (2012-2013)
 Joanna Koh-Hoe (2013-current)

The organisation underwent restructuring in 2012, and no longer has a president as the head of the organisation. Jason Wong, former Singapore Prisons Service deputy director and lobby group Honour Singapore board member, came on board as Chairman in October 2013.

Prior to the appointment of this unpaid role, Jason Wong also served as the chief executive officer of Singapore Corporation of Rehabilitative Enterprises (SCORE) offering rehabilitation to inmates and ex-offenders. During his tenure, he initiated the Yellow Ribbon Project, launched in 2004 to help reintegrate ex-inmates and their families into society. Later, being posted to the then-MCYS with a portfolio in child-protection services, he initiated the Dads for Life movement in 2009 to encourage active-fathering.

Awards and recognition
The Work-Life Leadership Award was conferred to Mrs. Joanna Koh-Hoe, President of Focus on the Family Singapore Ltd in 2010.  In 2010 and 2012, Focus on the Family Singapore received the Work-Life Excellence Award and the inaugural Sustained Work-Life Excellence Award in 2014 in recognition of the organisation’s success in promoting flexibility and work-life harmony.

References

External links
 Focus on the Family Singapore website

Focus on the Family
Charities based in Singapore